King Biscuit Flower Hour Presents the Waitresses is a live album by the band the Waitresses, recorded in 1982 at My Father's Place in Roslyn, New York, for the radio show King Biscuit Flower Hour. It was released in 1997, less than a year after lead singer Patty Donahue died of lung cancer.

Track listing
 "Intro" – 0:35
 "Quit" – 4:52
 "No Guilt" – 4:09
 "Wise Up" – 4:06
 "I Could Rule The World If I Could Only Get the Parts" – 3:52
 "I Know What Boys Like" – 4:41
 "Pussy Strut" – 4:55
 "Wasn't Tomorrow Wonderful?" – 4:06
 "Go On" – 3:11
 "It's My Car" – 3:47
 "Heat Night" – 3:28
 "Christmas Wrapping" – 5:59

References

The Waitresses live albums
1982 live albums